My Girl is a 2008 Philippine television drama series based on the 2005 South Korean drama series of the same title. The series was aired on ABS-CBN's Primetime Bida evening block from May 26 to September 5, 2008, replacing Maligno.

The series is streaming online on YouTube.

Synopsis

The story starts with Jasmine (Kim Chiu), a girl working with her two friends, Christine (Alex Gonzaga) and Jeffery (David Chua), as guides for Chinese tourists, to earn money for her and her father Chito (Lito Pimentel) who always gambles. One day he scores big time at a horse race; however he and Jasmine got robbed and Chito can no longer pay a gangster for his borrowed money. He overhears one day that he is a useless father and he leaves.

Jasmine and Julian (Gerald Anderson) first meet on an airplane. Jasmine is at the airport waiting for Christine and Jeffrey to arrive with their tour group. As a way of stalling, Jasmine acts as though her true love is on the plane and says that she wants to tell him how she feels before he leaves. Meanwhile, Julian is on his way to Cebu in search of his long-lost cousin, Hannah. Jasmine bumps into an old lady and accidentally falls onto the lap of Julian, making it the first time they ever see each other.

Julian is introduced as the new president of his grandfather's Amana Hotels. He had a girlfriend (Anika) who had refused his proposal for engagement to pursue her career as a beauty queen.

After Jasmine and Julian's paths are crossed, Jasmine becomes a Chinese translator for Julian. Apparently, his next project is building another hotel in China. When Jasmine earns enough money, she sends away her father into hiding, while she handles the problems made by her father. After a while, Julian resumes his search for his long-lost cousin Hannah (Nicole Uysuiseng). When he sees the resemblance between Jasmine and Hannah, he's forced to ask Jasmine to pretend to be his cousin so that his grandfather's last wish can be fulfilled. So therefore, they both are bound in a lie where no one in Julian's family can know the truth. Soon as Jasmine and Julian begin to get closer, Nico (Enchong Dee) and Annika (Nina Jose) begin to suspect that something more is going on between the two

They soon found out the truth about Jasmine and Julian when they overhear from other people. Niko keeps it a secret but lets Jasmine and Julian know that he knows about the secret. But Anika confronts Julian about it, and when Anika cannot stand it anymore, she yells at Jasmine and tells John (DJ Durano) and Lolo Greg (Ronaldo Valdez) the truth. After Jasmine is confronted, they tell her to leave and go far away from Julian. Jasmine decides to go to Baguio to live with her father. As Julian drives home from the airport, he has no idea what happened until he was confronted by Greg. Julian threatens to leave the family but Greg has a heart attack so Julian stays.

Hannah is found and is soon reunited with her family. Everyone knows this but Julian because if Julian found out, then he would be searching for Jasmine. As Julian returns home expectantly, he sees Hannah and finds out that she is his cousin. Julian leaves the family and searches out for Jasmine. As he found Jasmine, he tries to make her stay with him. Jasmine is really headstrong and does not allow it until she finally gives in.

When everything seems normal again, Greg calls Jasmine and threatens her to leave Julian which she does. Julian follows her everywhere and does not give up on it. Jasmine wants Julian to give up so she devises a plan to get Anika to have her as a target and as a liar to the whole family. Julian decides to leave for America then. Greg decides to give Jasmine another chance for them because he does not want Julian to leave, so he asks Jasmine to chase him. Julian planned not to leave and to start over so he pretends to go on the plane and stays in Nico's house for a day. Jasmine then believes that she is too late and Julian is gone. Nico decides to bring them back together so he brings Jasmine to Julian's house and after that, they get married.

Cast and characters

Main cast

Supporting cast

Extended cast

Reception
The Pinoy version of the hit Korean drama series, My Girl, starring Kim Chiu and Gerald Anderson, premiered May 26, 2008. It became the number one show of ABS-CBN and ranked no. 4 in AGB Nielsen Philippines in Mega Manila.

Soundtrack
ABS-CBN via Star Records Philippines released the "My Girl: The Original Teleserye Soundtrack" featuring its carrier single "Sabihin Mo Na" revived by Pinoy Dream Academy alumna Yeng Constantino originally sung by Top Suzara. The album also includes "Crazy Love (Chinese version)" performed by Kim Chiu, a duet of "Sabihin Mo Na" by Kim and Gerald, "My Girl" by Sam Milby, "Gulo, Hilo, Lito," by ex-Moonstar88 vocalist Acel Van Ommen and others.

Track list:
 My Girl by Sam Milby
 Sabihin Mo Na by Yeng Constantino
 Crazy Love (Chinese Version) by Kim Chiu
 Gulo, Hilo, Lito by Acel van Ommen
 Kahit 'Di Mo Napapansin by Richard Poon
 Pusong Lito by Kim Chiu
 Sabihin Mo Na by Kim Chiu & Gerald Anderson

See also
List of programs broadcast by ABS-CBN
List of ABS-CBN drama series

References

External links
 My Girl  My Girl Drama
 My Girl Telebisyon
 

ABS-CBN drama series
Philippine romantic comedy television series
Philippine teen drama television series
2008 Philippine television series debuts
2008 Philippine television series endings
Television series by Dreamscape Entertainment Television
Philippine television series based on South Korean television series
Filipino-language television shows
Television shows set in Manila